Seán T. Ruane (died 24 March 1967) was an Irish politician and schoolteacher. He was an independent member of Seanad Éireann from 1943 to 1957. He was first elected to the 4th Seanad in 1943 by the Labour Panel. He was re-elected at the 1944, 1948, 1951 and 1954 Seanad elections but lost his seat at the 1957 election.

References

Year of birth missing
1967 deaths
Irish schoolteachers
Members of the 4th Seanad
Members of the 5th Seanad
Members of the 6th Seanad
Members of the 7th Seanad
Members of the 8th Seanad
Independent members of Seanad Éireann